Chistyye Prudy is a rural locality (a khutor) in Burnovsky Selsoviet, Birsky District, Bashkortostan, Russia. The population was 5 as of 2010.

Geography 
Chistye Prudy is located 6 km east of Birsk (the district's administrative centre) by road. Nikolayevka is the nearest rural locality.

References 

Rural localities in Birsky District